Malik Montra James (born October 6, 1988) is a former professional American football cornerback. He played college football for the Langston Lions. He was signed by the Dallas Cowboys May 17, 2013, and released by the Cowboys on June 11, 2013. He also played college football for the Cincinnati Bearcats in 2009 and Nevada Wolfpack from 2010 to 2012. His older brother Mil'Von James was signed by the Cleveland Browns in 2008.

Pre-draft

External links

1988 births
Living people
Players of American football from Los Angeles
American players of Canadian football
Canadian football defensive backs
American football defensive backs
Cincinnati Bearcats football players
Nevada Wolf Pack football players
Langston Lions football players
Players of Canadian football from Los Angeles